Torsten Stenzel is a German musician, songwriter, composer and producer. Classically trained from an early age his roots are within the field of Electronic Dance Music. His interest for music first started at age 5 when he received piano lessons by academic piano teacher Andre Terebesi. 

Age 13 Stenzel changed to church organ and received his church organist diploma age 15. Graduating from the Protestant church in Frankfurt.

In 1990 he released his first single "Recall IV - Contrast" through Zyx Records. His partners failed to credit him as a writer/co-producer and because of his lack of knowledge of the music industry, only "mixed by Torsten Stenzel” appeared on the credits.
In 1992 Stenzel became A & R-Manager for the underground record label "Crash Records". It was his first job in the recording business and together with his partner at that time - Zied Jouini - he became responsible for the label. Their first release N.U.K.E - Nana went straight to No. 1 in Italy and No. 3 in Benelux.
In 1993 Stenzel started his collaboration with DJ Taucher, who had weekly shows at the Music Hall in Frankfurt.
The first release by the duo was the single Happiness. The second single Atlantis (1993: Planet Love Records) is still today considered a classic track within the EDM scene.

First Label (1993–1998) 

In 1993 Stenzel founded his first own underground label 'Liquid Records'. He now had the freedom to release whatever he choose and, unbeknownst to him at the time, it proved a wise decision. Together with fellow German, producer Oliver Lieb, he started the project 'Paragliders'. During this period he kept working with renowned electronic artists such as Booka Shade, Dj Tatana, Dj Taucher, Talla 2XLC and DJ Sakin. Stenzel released over 40 Vinyl-singles through Liquid Records.

Taucher and Stenzel 

In 1995 Stenzel bought the rights to 'Planet Love Records' in which he afore had been the A & R-Manager. He was now focused on developing his trance sounds together with compatriot Ralph-Armand Beck (aka. DJ Taucher). Their single 'Fantasy' was licensed to Sony Dancepool, and, surprisingly, it reached a top 50 position in the German media control charts. The third single 'Infinity' reached a top 50 position in Germany as well.
Until 1997 the duo remixed over 52 artists and were named the 'worldwide third best remixers' by readers of the magazine Raveline.
Stenzel and Taucher reworked tracks by amongst others Faithless - 'God is a DJ', which in several countries reached a number 1 position in the charts. The Stenzel-Taucher productions were also licensed by famed British producer and Dj Paul Oakenfold for some of his compilations. Furthermore, the duo also released productions under their alias' 'Red Light District' and 'Diver & Ace'.

Commercial Breakthrough - Dj Sakin & Friends (1999–2006) 

In 1998 Stenzel released the track 'Protect Your Mind' together with producer Sakin Bozkurt (Dj Sakin). It was the first single under the new project 'Sakin & Friends' and it was released through 'Planet Love Records'. 
They had produced a club version based on the film music by composer James Horner. Through 4 months several European Dj's played the track frequently and it quickly became a clubhit. In 1999 Stenzel licensed the track to the underground label 'Overdose' and produced a remix - (Suspicious Remix). 
Shortly after a single with the new remix was released it entered the German charts without a music video or further promotion. It became a fast selling item and after only one week it rose in the German music sales charts onto a number 3 position. In the German Dance Charts it hit a number 1 position, and additionally received Silver, Gold and Platin records in several European countries. It also reached number 4 in the UK charts in March 1999.
Today more than 700.000 copies of 'Protect Your Mind' have been sold and the track is considered to be one of the most popular trance productions ever released! 
The second single from the duo - 'Nomansland' featured the melody of an old TV show that Stenzel loved as a child (The Adventures of David Belfort). 'Nomansland' reached a 10th position in Germany and 16th position in the United Kingdom. It was difficult to continue the achievements of Sakin & Friends after the runaway success of 'Protect Your Mind', but even their debut album 'Walk on Fire' charted successfully. 
As a result of this success Stenzel decided to fulfill his dream and explore options outside of Germany. He moved to the Spanish Balearic island Ibiza and built a recording studio in his home close to San Jose.

York 

After setting up the studio in Ibiza, Stenzel worked promptly on his different projects. Among these York that he had started in 1997 with his brother Jörg Stenzel. Their first single The Awakening reached an 11th position in the UK charts. It became the first trance track that had the electric guitar as lead instrument. With more than 250.000 sold copies 'The Awakening' became one of the best selling singles that did not reach a top 10 position in the United Kingdom.
Their second single 'On The Beach' was released on the German producer Andreas Tomallas' (Talla 2XLC) label - 'Suck me Plasma'.
It was later on licensed to Sony Music Germany and Manifesto in The United Kingdom. 'On The Beach' was a conversion of British singer-songwriter Chris Rea. It instantly reached a top 3 position in Germany, United Kingdom and US. Stenzel had his second huge hit following 'Protect Your Mind'. Furthermore, Chris Rea was so positively affected by the conversion - which had sold more copies than the original from 1986 - that he helped promoting the track with a performance in the British 'Top of The Pops' show. Chris Rea and Stenzel started writing songs together, among others the track 'Your Love is Setting Me Free' by Watermen Meets Chris Rea.

Moby 

Stenzel has been a huge fan of Moby, since the release of the album Go in 1991. In 2001 Moby's manager contacted him and asked if he would be interested in remixing the new single Porcelain along with Rob Dougan, Futureshock and Force Mass Motion. Stenzel produced a deep Clubremix, that later on was released through Mute Records (US).

Ibiza Projects 

In 1999, after a short time in Ibiza, word of mouth spread and the biggest German music channel VIVA sent reporters to interview Stenzel. Local Dj's and producers in Ibiza welcomed him and he then met Dj Sin Plomo, who was a resident Dj in the Space-Club (We Love Sundays) and the well known KM 5-Club. They started an intensive collaboration and had numerous releases together on different labels. Among these they released a series of KM 5 compilation albums on Richard Branson's label Virgin Records. Additionally Stenzel worked with Sin Plomo's friend Paul Lomax. Together they produced two records Islands and Sweet Love - two typical Balearic sound tunes. Stenzel managed to get his Chillout Productions on the famous Cafe del Mar and Buddha Bar compilations. He also released an album and several singles in co-operation with Dj and producer Matt Caseli - resident Dj at Ibiza's most famous nightclub 'Pacha'.
- 2004 Stenzel met German Dj and producer Sven Greiner (Dj Shog) on Ibiza. Together they founded the record label '7th Sense Recordings' where they released various new trance projects under alias' such as Mandala Bros., Jolly Harbour and San Jose.
During his time in Ibiza, he had his now extremely successful daughter Jamie Lou Stenzel, Au/Ra, who is widely known for her single 'Panic Room'.

Tarja Turunen 

In 2006 the Finnish rock singer and ex-front figure of the rock band Nightwish was searching for new songs for her first solo album. Torsten's Kenyan songwriter friend Adrian Zagoritis pitched her the track Iceflowers, taken from the second 'York' album 'Peace' (2004). Tarja liked the production and was interested in writing music with Stenzel. 
It was a music direction totally new for Torsten. Tarja had the idea to write her new album in Ibiza, and he organized, together with the Berlin Department of Universal Music, a writing camp where they flew in 10 writers from all over Europe. They wrote about 75% of the songs on her debut album My Winter Storm at this session. Stenzel wrote 5 songs for this album of which 3 - 'The Reign', 'Damned & Divine' and 'Lost Northern Star' - were recorded in Santa Monica at the Remote Control Studios of Academy Award-nominee Hans Zimmer.
The album was released through Universal Music in 70 countries. It became a huge worldwide success and received several Gold and Platinum records in Finland, Russia and Germany.
In 2010 Tarja released her second album What Lies Beneath. Stenzel wrote two tracks for this album; one of these being the song 'Naiad'. The album reached top 5 in the German sales chart.

Los Angeles 
In 2006, Stenzel travelled to the US to promote the new album he produced with Jennifer Paige. He was introduced by Paige to musical genius and multi-Grammy winner, American Rick Nowels. After a short conversation Nowels wanted to hear the new songs produced with Jennifer Paige. He then asked Stenzel if he would be interested in playing keyboard for him as he was just completing new songs for the British girl band All Saints. Torsten eventually played keyboards on many of the songs including 'Chickfit', that was released as one of their 2007 singles off the album 'Studio One'.

Film Music 

Arriving in Antigua in late 2007, Torsten met the movie producer Rolant Hergert through an Antiguan friend. Rolant was shooting a new motion picture in Berlin called Fire. Torsten was invited to Berlin to score 'The Making of Fire'. After the producer heard his work, he replaced the original composer with Stenzel, who wrote the entire soundtrack in Antigua. Meanwhile, Stenzel made another soundtrack for a Caribbean documentary Vanishing Sail which won six awards, like the Caribbean Spirit award in 2015 .

Return of 'Planet Love Records' (2011–2019) 

Late 2011 major Dutch EDM label Armada Music announced that they had joined forces with Torsten's Planet Love Records. From 1992 - 1998 Planet Love Records was the homebase of several of Torsten's most successful early EDM productions. Furthermore, influential and classic tracks by signed artist such as 'Dj Tatana', 'Taucher', 'Talla 2XLC' and 'Dj Sakin & Friends'. 
In 1998 Torsten put his work with 'Planet Love Records' on hiatus as the family moved to Ibiza for new adventures. Today the Planet Love Records production facility is situated on the Caribbean island, Antigua.
Future plans for Planet Love Records and Armada Music are the release of the next artist album by York and the start of a new chillout compilation series. Furthermore, digital re-releasing several classic 'Planet Love Records' productions and new individual releases by signed artists.

Start 2012, Torsten Stenzel and Armada Music released volume 1 of a new compilation of chillout, downtempo, lounge productions. The 'Planet Chill - Compiled by York' compilations will see vol. 1–5 released within 2012. Featuring productions by Torsten's long term producer colleagues, some of his own classic productions and brand new exclusive unreleased material. Vol. 1–3 offer productions by acts such as Torsten's much respected own project 'York' and among others, international star EDM producers 'Matt Darey', 'The Thrillseekers', 'Solarstone', 'Roger Shah', 'Ayla', 'Kai Tracid', 'tyDi' & 'Mike Foyle'.

Start 2014, 'Planet Love Records' and sister-label 'Planet Love Classics' are now affiliated with Dutch record label Black Hole Recordings. An official announcement
was made public on 20 January. The Black Hole management announced upcoming new releases via Planet Love Records by acts such as York, Kai Tracid, Steve Brian, Asheni, Jennifer Paige, Deep Voices and Doris Pearson. Furthermore, there will also be new 2016 remixes from tracks out of the Planet Love Classics catalogue and from his new Studio Album "Traveller".

Mike Oldfield - Tubular Beats 

On February 1, 2013 world-renowned artist Mike Oldfield released the album Tubular Beats. As a collaboration between Mike Oldfield and Torsten Stenzel 'Tubular Beats' is a collection of some of the best known Oldfield tracks, remixed by Torsten under his York moniker. Unlike with previous club mixes, the album is a true two-sided collaboration between Oldfield and Stenzel, making use of parts from the original multitrack tapes as well as new parts played by Oldfield.

The album took two years to be completed, Torsten used the Apollo 8 recording in the song "Let There Be light", this gave the song the York's touch. On "Never Too Far" they used a track that both wrote together for York's album "Islanders", this result in one of the album's best songs, the peaceful background including Tarja Turunen voice invites the listener to a relaxation voyage.

Awards 

1999 Echo-nomination: Sakin & Friends for "Best national Dance Act"
Planet-Radio-Award: Protect Your Mind was the most wanted track in Radio 1999
Gold Record in Germany: 250.000 sold CDs: Sakin & Friends, Protect Your Mind
Silver Record in England: 200.000 sold CDs: Sakin & Friends, Protect Your Mind
Silver Record in England: 200.000 sold CDs: York, On The Beach
Platin Record in Denmark: 10.000 sold CDs: Sakin & Friends, Protect Your Mind
Gold Record in Denmark: 5.000 sold CDs: Sakin & Friends, "Protect Your Mind"
Gold Record in Greece: Over 30.000 sold CD's (2004): Hi-5 - Gennithika Ksana. Greek 'Pop Idol' (uk concept) winner.
Gold Record in Russia: 10.000 sold CDs: Tarja Turunen, My Winterstorm
Platin Record in Finland: over 30.000 sold CDs: Tarja Turunen, My Winterstorm
Gold Record in Germany: 100.000 sold CDs: Tarja Turunen My Winterstorm
Hollywood Music & Media Award (2012) for 'Best Chillout Track': Marla Maples House of Love. Produced by Torsten Stenzel.

Discography

Singles
1990 Recall IV - Contrast
1991 Trust In 6 - Life in Ecstasy
1992 Lyrical Terrorist - Lyrical Terrorists
1992 N.U.K.E. - Nana
1993 Taucher - Atlantis
1994 Paragliders - Paraglide
1995 Taucher - Fantasy
1995 Paragliders - Oasis
1995 Suspicious - Lovewaves
1996 Suspicious - Maid of Orleans
1996 Taucher - Waters
1996 Miss Yetti - La Pression Innovative
1996 DJ Buzz - Situations
1998 Front 242 - Headhunter
1998 Tatana & DJ Energy - End of Time
1998 York - The Awakening
1998 DJ Sakin & Friends - Protect Your Mind (For the Love of a Princess)
1999 DJ Sakin & Friends - Nomansland
1999 Taucher - Bizarre / Child of a Universe (Sanvean)
1999 York - Reachers of Civilisation
1999 Taucher & Talla 2XLC - Nightshift
1999 Ayla - Ayla Part 2
2000 Vanessa Mae & Sakin & Friends - Reminiscing
2002 ATB feat. York - The Fields of Love
2005 Elize - Automatic
2006 All Saints - Chickfit
2007 Mandala Bros. - Sleepwalking
2007 High 5 - Mena Fili
2008 Tarja Turunen - The Reign
2009 Niki Saletta & Mandala Bros. - Amazing
2010 DreamMan feat. York - Moonrise On The Beach
2010 Shontelle - Licky (Carnival of Souls Remix)
2015 The Kings Son - I'm not Rich (featuring Shaggy)
2017 York & Nathan Red feat. Doris Pearson - Moving in the Shadows
2017 York with Chola & Alexander KG Klaus - Greyhound (Remixes)
2017 York & Ramon Zenker - China Girl
2018 York - The Awakening 2018
2018 Made On Jupiter & York - Don't Care For Me
2019 York & Nathan Red feat. Kim Sanders - How Did I Fall In Love ?
2020 Jack Rainey & York - Fiction Ain't A Friend
2020 Jack Rainey & York - Fiction Ain't A Friend (Steve Brain Remix)
2021 York feat. Oly - Everything Changes
2021 York & Adam Novy - Hometown
2021 Nicholas Gunn & York feat. Sam Martin - Higher
2021 York & Au/Ra - Golden Hour
2021 York & Pull N Way - Spellbound
2022 York & SHEARS & Scot & Millfield - When You're Around
2022 York - Cry My Name
2002 York & Ava Silver - Evolving
2022 York & Steve Brian - Morning Light

Media Control / Charts International 
Every release is shown with its chart position and country abbreviation.

1990[a] N.U.K.E. Nana 4(NL)
1994[b] Taucher Fantasy 49(DE)
1995[b] Taucher Infinity 50(DE)
1998[g] Kai Tracid Liquid Skies 31(DE)
1999[c] Tatana End of Time 48(CH)
1999[b] Taucher Bizarre 32(DE)
1999[d] York The Awakening 11(UK)
1999[d] Ayla Ayla 22(UK)
1999[e] Tatana 24 Karat 9 (CH)
1999[b][c][d][g] Sakin & Friends Protect your Mind 3(DE) 4(UK),15(CH) 15 (FR) 7(NL) 14(NW) 23(BE) 2(IR) 20(AT) 23 (SE)
1999[h] Sakin & Friends Walk on Fire 71(DE) 23 (CH) 8 (NW)
2000[g][d][i] York On the Beach 4(UK) 23 (US)
2000[b][c][d][g] Sakin & Friends Nomansland 14(DE) 13(NL) 16(IR)
2000[d] York Farewell to the Moon 37 (UK)
2000[e] Tatana Pink Punk 5 (CH)
2001[d]York & ATB Fields of Love 16 (UK)
2003[j] Hi 5 Gennithika Ksana 1(GR)
2005[k] Elize Automatic 5(NL)
2007[l] Tarja Turunen My Winterstorm 3(DE) 15(UK) 1(FL) 11(AT) 1 (RU)

Studio albums 

 1996 - Taucher - Return to Atlantis
 2001 - York - Experience
 2001 - Taucher - Ebbe & Flut / (UK) High Tide - Low Tide
 2001 - Two Man Ahead - The Sign of a Difference
 2005 - Two Man Ahead - Crossing All Stars
 2005 - York - Peace
 2006 - All Saints - Studio 1
 2008 - Tarja Turunen - My Winter Storm
 2008 - Jennifer Paige - Best Kept Secret
 2008 - Asheni - Butterfly Survival Kit
 2012 - York - Islanders
 2013 - Mike Oldfield - Tubular Beats (produced by York)
 2016 - York - Traveller
 2022 - York - Indigo

Remixes
1998 Faithless - God is A DJ (Taucher Remix)
2000 Moby - Porcelain (Torsten Stenzel Remix)
2000 Taucher - Bizzare (DJ Sakin vs. Stenzel Mix)
2003 The Sunseekers - Oasis 2003 (DJ Mind-X vs. Stenzel Mix)
2007 DJ Sakin & Friends feat. Nadja Benaissa - Dirty Dancing (Torsten Stenzel Remix)

DJ Mixes/Compilations 
2007 Eye Trance Vol. 11
2000–2002 km 5 Ibiza - Vol. 3 & 4
2002 Chillin' in Ibiza Vol. 1
2003 Chillin' In Ibiza Vol. 2
2006 La Maison De L'Elephant Ibiza
2012 Planet Chill, Vol 1 - Compiled by York
2012 Planet Chill, Vol 2 - Compiled by York
2012 Planet Chill, Vol 3 - Compiled by York
2012 Planet Chill, Vol 4 - Compiled by York
2012 Planet Chill, Vol 5 - Compiled by York
2012 Planet Chill in The Mix (Deep Journey 2012) - Compiled by York
2013 Planet Chill 2013-01 - Compiled by York
2013 Planet Chill 2013-02 - Compiled by York
2013 Planet Chill 2013-03 - Compiled by York
2013 Planet Chill 2013-04 - Compiled by York
2014 Planet Chill 2014-01 - Compiled by York
2015 Planet Chill 2015-01 - Compiled by York
2015 Best of Planet Chill - Compiled by York
2017 Planet Chill 2017 - Compiled by York
2021 York & Sin Plomo Present: La Maison De L'Elephant

Filmography 
2007 Fire, Making Of, Produced by Shab Kirchner, interview Gary Dourdan
2008 Fire, Motion Picture, Arenico Production, produced by Rolant Hergert, ft. Gary Dourdan, Cosma Shiva Hagen, Ken Douken
2010 Memoirs of the Blue Soundtrack, Halivantigua Films, Produced by Bert Kirchner & Luke Hanson
2015 Vanishing Sail, Documentary by Indian Creek Film, Produced by Alexis Andrews & Charles Hambleton

References 

German record producers
German DJs
German expatriates in the United Kingdom
German expatriates in the United States
Living people
1971 births
Electronic dance music DJs